Anumanthan Mohan Kumar (born 14 July 1994), also known as Anu, is a Singaporean professional footballer who plays as a midfielder for Singapore Premier League club Lion City Sailors and the Singapore national team.

Club career

Young Lions
Anumanthan began his professional football career with the Young Lions in 2012. With the team short on numbers, the National Football Academy trainee was called up to the squad. He played his first game in a 1–1 draw against Balestier Khalsa on 1 April 2012.

Anumanthan was one of five youth players shortlisted for the inaugural Dollah Kassim Award in 2010, which was eventually won by future Young Lions teammate Ammirul Emmran Mazlan.

Anumanthan ended his Young Lions career on a high receiving offers from almost every club in the S.League vouching for his signature.

Hougang United
Anumanthan later went on to sign for Hougang United for the 2016 S.League campaign. During the annual S.League award night later that year, Anumanthan won the Young Player of the Year award and become the first Singaporean to win this award in 6 years after Hariss Harun won it in 2010. He was a vital member in the 2016 squad which almost made history by qualifying for their first ever AFC cup championship, after a solid campaign for the club that year.

Home United
Anumanthan signed for Home United in mid 2017 due to National Service commitments and featured his first game for the protectors against his former club Hougang United in October later that year. He went on to score his first goal for the club against rivals Warriors FC in a 2–1 loss. He ended the year by clinching 3rd placing in both the S.league and the RHB Singapore Cup in 2017.

In 2018, he went on to lead Home United to their first ever AFC Asian Cup Asean Zonal Championship title. He played a vital role in their successful campaign finishing 2nd in the Singapore Premier League.

Kedah

Anumanthan signed for Kedah FC in 2021. On 13 August, Anumanthan scored his first goal for Kedah with a header against Selangor F.C. at Darul Aman Stadium. Kedah went on to lose the match 2–4.

Lions City Sailors 
Anumanthan signed for Lions City Sailors in 2022.

During the Sailors' 2022 AFC Champions League campaign in Buriram, Thailand, Anumanthan and defender Tajeli Salamat were expelled from the squad and sent back to Singapore for breaking the team's curfew.

International career
Anumanthan was part of the Singapore national under-23 team that won the bronze medal at the 2013 Southeast Asian Games.

Anumanthan was called up to the senior team in July 2013. He made his senior debut for Singapore in a 2015 AFC Asian Cup qualifying match against Oman on 14 August 2013, coming on for striker Indra Shahdan Daud in the 70th minute. He followed it up with his first start in a friendly match against China on 6 September 2013.

During the 2019 Southeast Asian Games held in the Philippines, Anumanthan was one of nine footballers who had broken curfew. He, along with the other eight players, was punished with a fine by the Singapore National Olympic Council.

In 2022, Anumanthan was included in the team for the 2022 FAS Tri-Nations Series and 2022 AFF Championship.

Career statistics

Club

. Caps and goals may not be correct.

 Young Lions are ineligible for qualification to AFC competitions.

International

U19 International caps

Honours

International
Singapore
Southeast Asian Games: bronze medal 2013

Individual 
S.League Young Player of the Year: 2016

References

1994 births
Living people
Singaporean footballers
Singapore international footballers
Singapore Premier League players
Association football midfielders
Singaporean people of Tamil descent
Singaporean sportspeople of Indian descent
Young Lions FC players
Footballers at the 2014 Asian Games
Southeast Asian Games bronze medalists for Singapore
Southeast Asian Games medalists in football
Competitors at the 2013 Southeast Asian Games
Asian Games competitors for Singapore